HardBall III is a multiplatform baseball video game developed by MindSpan and published by Accolade between 1992 and 1994 for the Sega Genesis, Super Nintendo Entertainment System and DOS platforms. The game is licensed by the Major League Baseball Players Association and is the sequel to HardBall II.

The console versions are simplified versions of the HardBall series found on the personal computers of the time. Season stats are logged through a lengthy password in these versions due to the lack of a hard disk drive that was already common in the more expensive personal computers at that time.

Release 
In November 1993, Accolade signed an agreement with Atari Corporation to be a third-party developer for the recently released Atari Jaguar and licensed five titles from their catalog to Atari Corp. in order to be ported and released for the system, with HardBall III (then titled Al Michaels Announces HardBall III) being among the five licensed games and it was first announced in early 1994. It was originally planned for a Q3 1995 release date and was being developed by NuFX. However, the port went unreleased for unknown reasons.

Reception
Computer Gaming World in 1992 said that "HardBall III looks like another winner", complementing its emphasis on action while also providing simulation functions. The magazine praised its "glorious" support for VGA graphics and sound cards, and concluded that the game "packs more features in a single box than any of its competitors". Reviewing the Super NES version, GamePro praised the huge number of options and player stats, but felt the rough graphics and "choppy" player movements reduce the game to merely above average.

References

External links 
 HardBall III at GameFAQs
 HardBall III at Giant Bomb
 HardBall III at MobyGames

1992 video games
Accolade (company) games
Baseball video games
Cancelled Atari Jaguar games
DOS games
HardBall!
North America-exclusive video games
Super Nintendo Entertainment System games
Sega Genesis games
Video games developed in the United States
Multiplayer and single-player video games